André Pierre Verdaine (9 May 1923 – 13 August 2005) was a French wrestler. He competed in the men's Greco-Roman lightweight at the 1952 Summer Olympics.

References

1923 births
2005 deaths
French male sport wrestlers
Olympic wrestlers of France
Wrestlers at the 1952 Summer Olympics